The Idaho State Historical Society (ISHS) is a historical society located in the U.S. state of Idaho that preserves and promotes the state's cultural heritage.

The society was founded as the Historical Society of Idaho Pioneers in 1881, nine years before statehood in 1890, and was established as a state agency in 1907. Employing over 50 staff and over 100 volunteers; it includes the Idaho State Historical Museum, the official state museum; the Idaho State Archives, which provides public access to state archives, for which it is responsible, in addition to a variety of other reference material; the State Historic Preservation Office, which maintains records of historic places and archaeological sites in the state; and the Historic Sites Program, which oversees a number of historic sites including the Old Idaho State Penitentiary.

History and organization
The ISHS was established in 1881, eighteen years after the Idaho Territory was established, and nine years before statehood in 1890. Initially named the Historical Society of Idaho Pioneers, its goal was to discover and preserve Idaho’s heritage. Early efforts of the Historical Society led to the establishment of the Idaho State Historical Society as a state agency in 1907.

The ISHS is charged with responsibility of preserving Idaho’s rich history and prehistory in accordance with Chapters 41 and 46 of Title 67 of the Idaho Code, and other statutory capacity assigned by Titles 14, 31, 33, 58, and 63. A board of trustees has statutory authority for setting policy for the society, which serves as an agency of the State Board of Education.  

From its original "library and cabinet" meant to preserve "literary and scientific objects" the Society has evolved to include the Idaho State Historical Museum, the Public Archives and Research Library, the State Historic Preservation Office, the Historic Sites Program, and the Administration unit. The ISHS has a seven-member Board of Trustees appointed by the governor to represent Idaho's seven judicial districts.  The Society now directly reaches more than 100,000 people annually and serves an additional 700,000 on its web site. http://www.history.idaho.gov

Idaho State Historical Museum

The Idaho State Historical Museum, located in Idaho’s capital city of Boise, is the official state historical museum. From its origin as a "cabinet of curiosities," the Idaho State Historical Museum has become the largest and most visited museum in the state.  Its many interactive programs educate visitors in the historical value of its diverse and comprehensive collections. It is the official repository of artifacts relating to Idaho’s and regional history.

The museum’s collection is made up of over 250,000 objects.  The collection includes a comprehensive permanent exhibit on Idaho’s history, and exhibits on the state’s varied cultures, occupations, and experiences. The museum also produces and hosts special temporary and traveling exhibits on a wide variety of historical and cultural subjects. The museum developed the J. Curtis Earl Exhibit at the Old Idaho State Penitentiary, featuring one of the nation’s largest collections of historic arms and military memorabilia. The museum also developed and maintains the adjacent Pioneer Village, which includes some of the oldest buildings in Idaho: the Isaac Coston log cabin (1863), Thomas Logan adobe house (1865), and the Richard Adelmann house (1870-80s). Currently under construction in the village is the Lewis and Clark Discovery Trail, an outdoor, hands-on interpretive area focused on the scientific legacy of the Voyage of Discovery.

The Idaho State Historical Museum was one of the first western institutions, and the first in the state of Idaho, to be accredited by the American Alliance of Museums (AAM). The museum strictly follows the professional standards and procedures set by the AAM. It hosts over 30,000 visitors each year, including approximately 12,000 schoolchildren. It developed and maintains educational trunks and exhibits that travel to communities statewide. It also Provides statewide technical assistance to small museums and individuals.

Public Archives and Research Library
The Idaho State Archives (ISA) provides public and scholarly access to a large collection of material relating to the history of Idaho and the Pacific Northwest. The collection is extremely varied in subject, geographic area, and time period. ISA is open to the public and serves over 12,000 on- and off-site researchers on an annual basis. The staff also provide technical assistance on records management issues to governmental agencies in Idaho and general workshops on research methodology and other topics for the public.

Public archives

On March 12, 1947, the Idaho Legislature enacted legislation assigning state archival authority to the ISHS (Idaho Session Laws, C.161'47, pp. 416–417).  The Society was charged with establishing a unified state archive "in order to preserve and protect the historically important state, county, city, and village archives, and thus facilitate the use of Idaho records for official reference and historical research." The law further authorized and empowered custodians of records not in current use, but of historical significance to the state, or any county, city, or village, to deliver the records to the ISHS for permanent preservation. The law provided for the certification of such records by the ISHS and authorized the ISHS to require and supervise the collection of historically important archives. These powers and duties are captured in Idaho Code 67-4126.  The archives has been part of PARL since 2006.

The archive serves as a focal point for public records management standards guidelines, procedures, and educational offerings covering:

 essential records protection
 file classification and maintenance
 electronic records management
 microfilm preparation and transfer
 non-current records storage and retrieval
 security storage of microfilm copies of essential records
 disaster preparedness and recovery information
 records retention and disposition
 archival records transfer procedures

Research Library 
The Research Library provides access and reference, both in person and digitally, to any patron who submits a query. The collection is varied and comprehensive within its focus on the history of Idaho. 
The library’s holdings cover a wide variety of mediums, including:
 an estimated  of manuscript and state archives material
 approximately 30,000 rolls of microfilm, including Idaho newspapers dating from 1863 to present
 approximately 500,000 photographic images (prints, negatives, slides, and transparencies)
 approximately 5,000 motion picture films and videos
 an extensive oral history collection with approximately 3,100 individual interviews (audio, video and digital formats)
 approximately 32,000 maps and architectural drawings
 an open-stack reference collection of approximately 25,000 book and periodical titles
 materials assembled by the library including: public archive records, vertical files (clipping files), in-house developed indexes, a reconstructed 1890 census, county records, Old Idaho State Penitentiary records, genealogical assistance, and microfilm access to many of Idaho's founding newspapers.

PARL has been working with the Northwest Digital Archives to provide access to manuscript collections within PARL. The goal of this collaboration is to develop finding aids to provide patrons with an understanding of the collections available. PARL has already developed a finding aid for oral histories from guards of the Old Idaho State Penitentiary that includes interviews on the prison, prison architecture, prison riots, and prisoner's rights.

The Historical Society holds a collection of 3,000 negatives, scrapbooks and prints by Idaho photographer Everett L. "Shorty" Fuller (17 November 1906 - 10 August 2000). Fuller's photographs document street scenes, parades, and daily life in Boise during the 1930s and 1940s.

Idaho Oral History Center 

The Idaho Oral History Center (IOHC) collects recordings of oral interviews of Idahoans who have lived through much of Idaho's history. The oral history collection currently  includes almost 3,200 interviews, recorded on both audiotape and videotape. Nearly all have been indexed, and many have been fully transcribed. Since 1999 the IOHC's Oral Historian and Office Specialist have conducted interviews and have begun processing those interviews, as well as interviews donated to the IOHC by individuals. The IOHC placed basic information about processed interviews conducted between 1969 and 1998 on its website. Topics covered in the interviews include frontier and pioneer life, the Civilian Conservation Corps, mining, the women's movement of the 1960s and 1970s, and various ethnic groups in the state. Interviews are available to researchers at the PARL and, with a few exceptions, through interlibrary loan services.

The Center offers information on oral history methods by means of workshops and instructional guides. The Idaho Oral History Center is an official partner and archive of the National Veterans History Project.

State Historic Preservation Office
The Idaho State Historic Preservation Office (SHPO) was established in 1966 to lead historic preservation in the state. The Idaho SHPO undertakes a wide variety of statewide activities. Its responsibilities include managing the National Register of Historic Places program for the state. The SHPO also maintains Idaho’s inventory of records for archaeological sites and historic buildings and structures. Currently, there are approximately 70,000 properties in the inventory. 

The SHPO works with Federal and State agencies, cities, counties, and tribes to minimize the effects of development on historic properties and assists developers in obtaining Federal tax incentives for appropriate rehabilitation of historic buildings. It is responsible for planning preservation activities and cultural resource management. It is also responsible for overseeing the Archeological Survey of Idaho, including caring for its collections and conducting and overseeing archaeological investigations in Idaho.

Historic Sites
The Historic Sites program oversees sites at Pierce, Franklin, Rock Creek, and Boise, including the National Historic Landmark Assay Office, where the State Historic Preservation Office is located. These sites give visitors the opportunity to immerse themselves in locations significant to Idaho’s history. The Historic Sites managed by the ISHS include:

 Pierce Courthouse in Pierce, Idaho’s oldest public building.
 Rock Creek Station and Stricker Homesite, located southeast of Twin Falls. A popular camping spot along the Oregon Trail, the area was the location of the first trading post between Boise and Fort Hall. It was the center of commerce in south central Idaho prior to the coming of the railroad.
 Franklin Historic Properties, including the Lorenzo Hill Hatch House, the Pioneer Relic Hall, the Franklin Cooperative Mercantile Institution, and the John Doney House in Franklin.
 The Old Idaho Penitentiary State Historic Site, the Assay Office, and the Bureau of Reclamation Building in Boise. The Old Idaho Penitentiary State Historic Site is the largest site managed by the ISHS and one of the largest National Register of Historic Places sites in Idaho. The society's primary focus at the site is interpreting the history of the site for visitors in an effort to encourage those visitors to become advocates for its preservation. Programs available at or relating to the site include:  
 self-guided tours of the Old Penitentiary to the general public
 guided walks of the Old Penitentiary to the general public
 interpretive programs of the Old Penitentiary for school/educational groups
 interpretive exhibits located throughout the various prison buildings
 interpretive video "Doing Time"
 information about and resources regarding the Old Idaho Penitentiary on the internet including the Old Idaho Penitentiary Educational Resource Kit and Old Penitentiary Worksheets.

Publications 

Idaho Yesterdays is a peer-reviewed historical journal published by the ISHS. Initiated in 1957, the periodical was distributed to society members and focused on current historical and cultural research on Idaho and its region. In spring 2009 it became an electronic journal, with new issues published and archived online and access no longer requiring ISHS membership. The current editor is Kevin R. Marsh of Idaho State University.

The ISHS also publishes a quarterly newsletter, Mountain Light, as well as books, pamphlets and other materials.

Notable Artifacts 

 Nampa figurine

References

External links 
 
 
 Idaho State Historical Museum 

 
State historical societies of the United States
1881 establishments in Idaho Territory
History of Idaho
Historical Society
Historical societies in Idaho
State history organizations of the United States
History museums in Idaho
Museums in Boise, Idaho